Bernhard Heinrich Irrgang (23 July 1869 – 8 April 1916) was a German organist, composer and docent for organ practice.

Life 
Irrgang was born in Zduny, former Province of Posen. His father was a Protestant cantor and teacher in Zduny. Bernhard was educated at the Royal Music Institute of Berlin from 1890 to 1896 and in the academic master class in composition. Active as an organist in various parishes from the beginning of his studies, Irrgang was a member of the Berlin Philharmonic from 1897.Memorial Bernhard Irrgang. In Berlin.Friedparks.de. The pupil  worked from 1894 to 1905 as organist at the newly built  in Kreuzberg, then until 1910 as music director at the St. Mary's Church, Berlin. From 1910, he was organist at the Berlin Cathedral.

The organ virtuoso was known in Berlin for his "groundbreaking" concerts. Among his performances were over 550 free weekly concerts, at which he performed, among others, compositions by Josef Rheinberger's In 1909 Irrgang made a concert tour to Sweden.

From 1905, he taught organ playing at the Stern conservatory and from 1912 at the Royal Music Institute of Berlin. Among his pupils was John J. McClellan. Irrgang composed organ sonatas and er, motets and aria in his sonatas following the tradition of Felix Mendelssohn Bartholdy and Josef Rheinberger. For Irrgang's appreciation of Rheinberger, see his letter dated 5 October 1901: Bernhard Irrgang introduces himself to Rheinberger by letter as an admirer and thanks him for Sonata No. 20. In J. G. Rheinberger-Archiv, Vaduz.

 counted Irrgang's organ playing "among the most manly memories of our youth." For , who met him in 1914, he was one of the "great organ masters" of the time.

Irrgang died in Berlin at the age of 46. The State Institute for Music Research Berlin has a Bernhard Irrgang Collection which contains organ appraisals, concert reviews and programmes, and sheet music; the Staatsbibliothek zu Berlin keeps 87 of Irrgang's autographs in its music department, mainly letters.

Work 
 Choralbuch zu dem . Im Auftrag des Deutschen Evangelischen Kirchenausschusses. Mittler, Berlin 1916.

Further reading 
 Irrgang, Bernhard. In Rudolf Vierhaus (ed.): Deutsche Biographische Enzyklopädie. 2. edition. K. G. Saur Verlag, Munich 2006, volume Hitz–Kozub. .
 Detlef Giese: Kaiserreich und Weimarer Republik. Otto Dienel, Bernhard Irrgang, Alexander Preuß. In Ingeborg Allihn (ed.): Wie mit vollen Chören. 500 Jahre Kirchenmusik in Berlins historischer Mitte. Ortus, Beeskow 2010, .

References

External links 

 
 Bernhard Irrgang, Brustbild. In '', Uni-Frankfurt.de

19th-century German composers
20th-century German composers
German classical organists
Academic staff of the Berlin University of the Arts
1869 births
1916 deaths
People from Krotoszyn County